This is the results breakdown of the local elections held in Galicia on 27 May 2007. The following tables show detailed results in the autonomous community's most populous municipalities, sorted alphabetically.

Overall

City control
The following table lists party control in the most populous municipalities, including provincial capitals (shown in bold). Gains for a party are displayed with the cell's background shaded in that party's colour.

Municipalities

A Coruña
Population: 243,320

Ferrol
Population: 76,399

Lugo
Population: 93,450

Ourense
Population: 108,137

Pontevedra
Population: 80,096

Santiago de Compostela
Population: 93,458

Vigo
Population: 293,255

References

Galicia
2007